Polsham was a railway station on the Somerset and Dorset Railway in the village of Polsham, Somerset in England.

Opening in December 1861 on the Somerset Central Railway, which was at that time worked by the Bristol and Exeter Railway, it was the only intermediate station on the short branch from Glastonbury to Wells (Priory Road) railway station, which had opened in 1859. The station consisted of one short platform with a station building, with a single siding for freight. In 1950 unloading of wagons was effected by opening the side door and allowing this to rest on the adjacent fence. A lorry was then driven through an orchard to receive the goods. The siding and the adjacent level crossing were controlled from a small covered ground-frame.

Polsham was downgraded to a halt in 1938, with tickets being sold by the train guard. Only a year before closure, six of the seven different types of ticket that were issued by the guard for travel from Polsham were still marked as being issued by the "Somerset & Dorset Joint Railway Committee", an illustration of the poor usage of the line. The station closed with the Wells branch in 1951.

The site today

The site is now a private house but the platform survives.

References

External links
https://web.archive.org/web/20070928075957/http://www.sdjr.net/locations/polsham.html
 Station on navigable O.S. map

Disused railway stations in Somerset
Former Somerset and Dorset Joint Railway stations
Railway stations in Great Britain opened in 1861
Railway stations in Great Britain closed in 1951
1861 establishments in England